The 2019 Swiss Wheelchair Curling Championship was held from February 7 to 10, 2019 in St. Gallen.

Teams

Round-robin results and standings

Playoffs
Sunday, February 10, 13:30

Classification for 7th place

Classification for 5th place

Bronze medal game

Final

Final standings

References

Swiss Wheelchair Curling Championship
Swiss Wheelchair
Curling, Swiss Wheelchair
Curling, Swiss Wheelchair
Curling, Swiss Wheelchair